Hwarang: The Poet Warrior Youth is a South Korean television series starring Park Seo-joon, Go A-ra, and Park Hyung-sik. It revolves around an elite group of young men called Hwarang, who discover their passion, friendship and love in the turmoil of the Silla Kingdom (57 BC–AD 935). The series aired every Monday and Tuesday at 22:00 (KST) on KBS2, from December 19, 2016 to February 21, 2017.

The show was noted for the star-studded cast, but received criticism for its distractive storytelling and undeveloped plot.

At the 31st KBS Drama Awards, Choi Won-young won the "Best Supporting Actor" and Park Seo-joon received a nomination for the prestigious "Top Excellence Award".

Synopsis 
Queen Jiso as regent, has been the ruler of Silla since the death of her father, King Beopheung, while keeping her son, Sammaekjong, hidden from enemies and assassins.

As the young King comes of age, citizens, officials and Sammaekjong himself, have all grown impatient for her to cede power. However, the powerful nobles that tried to usurp the power continue to eye the throne, and Jiso fears the consequences of her ceding it.

In order to break the power of the nobles, who have grown accustomed to their privileges under the bone rank system, Jiso plans to create a new elite group, the Hwarang, that will cut across the existing power factions, and to bind them to protect her son and the throne.

As this new elite group of male youths bond and grow, they are unaware that within their number is their King, Sammaekjong, and Kim Sun-woo, a commoner with a secret even he is not aware of.

Cast

Main 
 Park Seo-joon as Moo-myung / Kim Sun-woo / Kim Isabu / Dog-bird 
A young man of low birth, who rises above his situation in life and becomes a legendary Hwarang warrior. He assumes the identity of his friend, Kim Sun-woo, after he is killed by one of the Queen Regent's men.
 Go Ara as Kim Ah-ro
A "half-breed" (derogative term for an offspring born to a Jingol father and a low-class mother), with a cheerful and straightforward personality. She works multiple jobs to support her family.
 Park Hyung-sik as Sammaekjong / Kim Ji-dwi / Jinheung of Silla 

The young and distrustful King, who goes into hiding due to assassination attempts. He joins the Hwarang under the name of "Kim Ji-dwi", Lord Kim Wi-hwa's nephew.

Supporting

Hwarangs 
 Sung Dong-il as Lord Kim Wi-hwa 
The 1st Pungwolju of the Hwarang, who acts as a fatherly figure towards the boys. Secret adviser of Ji-dwi.

 Do Ji-han as Park Ban-ryu
Having been taught politics (by his two fathers – Park Young-shil and Park Ho, as his adoptive and biological fathers, respectively) from an early age, he is a cold-blooded Seonggol, who is competitive and seeks for more power.
 Choi Min-ho as Kim Soo-ho
A Seonggol aristocrat born with a silver spoon in his mouth. Hot-blooded and chivalrous, he aces in swordplay and is seen as a shameless playboy but is devoted in love. Kim Soo-yeon's overprotective older brother.
Kim Tae-hyung as Seok Han-sung
The youngest Hwarang, who has a warm personality and gets along with everyone. He is a bright and innocent boy who carries a heavy burden as the last Seonggol of his clan. Dan-se's younger half-brother.
 Jo Yoon-woo as Kim Yeo-wool
A man who "has a mysterious charm and loves dressing up more than most women", he is thoughtful and caring, but possesses a sharp tongue. His mother is the previous King's sister, while his Jingol father's identity still remains a mystery.

 Kim Hyun-jun as Seok Dan-se
22 years old, part of Soo-ho's clique. He is Han-sung's elder half-brother, who is powerless due to his "half-breed" status and is always looked down by their grandfather. Assigned as Sun-woo's trainee.
 Yoo Jae-myung as Pa-oh
Sammaekjong's personal bodyguard, who cares for him like a father, as well as Ji-dwi's assigned trainee.
 Jang Se-hyun as Kang Sung
Part of Ban-ryu's clique. Originally one of the Hwarang rejects, he is later scouted by Park Young-shil in order to undermine the Hwarang. Assigned as Ban-ryu's trainee.
 Jin Ju-hyung as Jang Hyun
Part of Soo-ho's clique.
 Jun Bum-soo as Kim Shin
Part of Ban-ryu's clique.
 Jung Young-hoon as Kim Ki-bo
Part of Ban-ryu's clique.
 Park Ki-hoon as Joo Ki

Royal Family 
 Kim Ji-soo as Queen Jiso
Silla's acting Queen Regent, who has hidden her son, Sammaekjong, ever since the death of her father, the previous King, 11 years ago. She is the founder of the Hwarang and has many dark secrets within.
 Seo Yea-ji as Princess Suk-myung
Sammaekjong's maternal half-sister, as well as future consort.

 Song Young-kyu as Lord Kim Hwi-kyung
Queen Jiso's elder brother and originally the Crown Prince of Silla, his name was removed from the Royal Family's records due to polio. Sun-woo (Moo-myung)'s biological father.

Royal Capital citizens 

 Choi Won-young as Lord Kim Ahn-ji
A Jingol who was driven to poverty and was separated from his only son, Sun-woo, 12 years prior. Works as a physician aided by his daughter Ah-ro.
 Kim Kwang-kyu as Pi Joo-ki
Owner of the store Dayiseo, as well as its subsidiary tea-house, Sutabaksu.
 Lee Da-in as Kim Soo-yeon
Younger sister of Soo-ho and Ah-ro's only friend.

Makmangchon people 
 Lee Kwang-soo as Mak-moon / Kim Sun-woo (Ep. 1–3)
Moo-myung's friend. Originally named "Sun-woo", he was separated from his family for 12 years by Queen Jiso’s men, and ended up at Makmangchon. Killed because he saw the King's face.
 Kim Won-hae as Woo Reuk (Ep. 1–3, 6 & 8–10)
Refugee from the conquered Daegaya. Renowned musician and inventor as well as master of the gayageum, he becomes the music and dance teacher of the Hwarang. Mak-moon & Moo-myung's foster father in Makmangchon, who (along with Kim Hwi-kyung) holds the secret to Moo-myung's true identity.

Ministers of Silla 
 Kim Chang-wan as Park Young-shil
Ban-ryu's adoptive father. A cruel and cunning leader of the opposition, who yearns for more power, and would do anything to overthrow and kill the King.
 Lee Byung-joon as Park Ho
Ban-ryu's biological father. Member of the opposition due to indebtedness to Park Young-shil.
 Ko In-bum as Kim Seup
Soo-ho and Soo-yeon's father. Main supporter of the Royal Family.
 Kim Jong-goo as Seok Hyun-jae
Han-sung and Dan-se's grandfather. Member of the opposition.

Extended
 Kang Dong-woo as Mu-cheol
 Song Min-hyung as Kim Hyung-won
 Baek Jae-jin as Yang Jo-jang
 Ban Min-jung as Mi Roo-hyang
 Lee Kwan-hoon as A-chu
 Lee Kyu-hyung as Do-go
 Lee Min-ho as So-gam
 Park Ha-yan as Yoo-ji
 Oh Eun-ho as Mo-yeong

Special appearance 
 Kim Min-jun as Crown Prince Chang (later Wideok of Baekje) (Ep. 14–15)

Production

Development
The series reunited Sung Dong-il and Go A-ra, who previously worked together in tvN's Reply 1994 (2013), as well as Sung and Yoo Jae-myung, who both starred in the hit series Reply 1988 (2016). It also serves as a reunion to Park Hyung-sik and Choi Won-young, who worked together in SBS's hit drama, The Heirs (2013). It also reunited Park and Kim Won-hae, who worked together in Nine: Nine Time Travels (2013).

The first script reading took place in March 2016. Filming began on March 31, and finished on September 1, 2016.

Original soundtrack

Part 1

Part 2

Part 3

Part 4

Part 5

Part 6

Part 7

Part 8

Part 9

Part 10

Charted Songs

Ratings
 In this table,  represent the lowest ratings and  represent the highest ratings.
 NR denotes that the drama did not rank in the top 20 daily programs on that date.

Awards and nominations

References

External links 
  
 
 
 
 
Korean Broadcasting System television dramas
South Korean historical television series
2016 South Korean television series debuts
2017 South Korean television series endings
Television series set in Silla
Television series by Oh! Boy Project
South Korean pre-produced television series